Henri-Gaston-Jules-Louis Bouy (2 September 1866 – 1943), known as Gaston Bouy , was a French artist who studied under Amédée Bourson and exhibited at the Salon des Artistes Francais. He mostly worked in pastels and his female figures are especially prized.

References

1866 births
1943 deaths
19th-century French painters
French male painters
20th-century French painters
20th-century French male artists
19th-century French male artists